Ilderton Thomas Lumley (9 December 1924 – 17 December 2009) was an English footballer who played as an inside forward in the Football League.

References

External links

1924 births
2009 deaths
English footballers
Sportspeople from Consett
Footballers from County Durham
Charlton Athletic F.C. players
Barnsley F.C. players
Darlington F.C. players
English Football League players
Consett A.F.C. players
Association football inside forwards